Dawid Boois (born 13 January 1952) is a Namibian politician and educator. A member of SWAPO, Boois was the Governor of the southern ǁKaras Region and a member of the National Assembly from 2000 to 2005. In the 2010 regional elections, Boois won the Berseba Constituency with 1,225 votes. He remained Berseba councillor also after the 2015 regional elections which he won with 1,774 votes. As an educator, Boois was a teacher at the Ecumenical Community Secondary School in Berseba.

Boois was involved in a controversy regarding the different factions of the traditional leadership of the ǀHaiǀKhaua (Berseba Orlam) subtribe of the Nama people. He supported a group contesting the legitimacy of the reunification of the Goliath and Isaak rival clans and tried to extend the 50-year-long split of the Berseba Orlam. Eventually Boois supported the unity of the tribe by reconciling with fellow former ǁKaras governor Stephanus Goliath early in 2011.

Business interests
According to transparency documents released in 2003 while Boois was a member of the National Assembly, the Berseba-native is a director of Kaiseb Fishing. He also owns 8% of the shares in the company. He also owns over 15,000 shares in Southern Namibia Hake Fishing Industries alongside fellow SWAPO politician Willem Konjore. He also owns a restaurant and hotel in ǁKaras Region.

References

1952 births
Living people
SWAPO politicians
Nama people
People from ǁKaras Region
Members of the National Assembly (Namibia)
Namibian businesspeople
Namibian educators